Ernest Chuard (31 July 1857, in Corcelles-près-Payerne – 9 November 1942) was a Swiss politician and member of the Swiss Federal Council (1919–1928).

He was elected to the Swiss Federal Council on 11 December 1919 and handed over office on 31 December 1928. He was affiliated to the Free Democratic Party. 

During his office time he held the Department of Home Affairs and he was President of the Confederation in 1924.

External links 

1857 births
1942 deaths
People from Broye-Vully District
Swiss Calvinist and Reformed Christians
Free Democratic Party of Switzerland politicians
Members of the Federal Council (Switzerland)
Members of the National Council (Switzerland)
University of Lausanne alumni